The KA postcode area, also known as the Kilmarnock postcode area, is a group of 30 postcode districts in south-west Scotland, within 23 post towns. These cover East Ayrshire, North Ayrshire (including the Isle of Arran) and South Ayrshire.

Coverage
The approximate coverage of the postcode districts:

|-
!KA1
|KILMARNOCK
|Kilmarnock Centre, Bonnyton, Grange, Bellfield, Riccarton, Shortlees, Caprington, Hurlford
|East Ayrshire
|-
!KA2
|KILMARNOCK
|Knockentiber, Crosshouse, Dundonald
|East Ayrshire, South Ayrshire
|-
!KA3
|KILMARNOCK
|Longpark, Hillhead, Knockinlaw, Altonhill, Onthank, Beansburn, Southcraigs, New Farm Loch, Whinpark, Kilmaurs, Stewarton, Dunlop, Lugton, Fullwood, Kingsford, Fenwick, Crookedholm
|East Ayrshire, North Ayrshire
|-
!KA4
|GALSTON
|Galston, Moscow
|East Ayrshire
|-
!KA5
|MAUCHLINE
|Mauchline, Tarbolton, Catrine, Sorn
|East Ayrshire
|-
!KA6
|AYR
|Mossblown, Annbank, Coylton, Dalrymple, Hollybush, Drongan, Rankinston, Patna, Waterside, Dalmellington, Bellsbank
|South Ayrshire, East Ayrshire
|-
!KA7
|AYR
|Ayr Centre, Holmston, Forehill, Belmont, Castlehill, Kincaidson, Alloway, Doonfoot, Masonhill, Dunure
|South Ayrshire
|-
!KA8
|AYR
|Braehead, Newton on Ayr, Woodfield, Heathfield, Whitletts, Lochside, Dalmilling, Craigie, Wallacetown
|South Ayrshire
|-
!KA9
|PRESTWICK
|Prestwick, Monkton
|South Ayrshire
|-
!KA10
|TROON
|Troon, Barassie, Muirhead, Loans
|South Ayrshire
|-
!KA11
|IRVINE
|Perceton, Lawthorn, Girdle Toll, Stanecastle, Bourtreehill, Broomlands, Dreghorn, Springside
|North Ayrshire
|-
!KA12
|IRVINE
|Irvine Centre, Fullarton, Stanecastle 
|North Ayrshire
|-
!KA13
|KILWINNING
|Kilwinning
|North Ayrshire
|-
!KA14
|BEITH
|Beith, Glengarnock, Longboat 
|North Ayrshire
|-
!KA15
|BEITH
|Beith, Glengarnock, Longboat
|North Ayrshire
|-
!KA16
|NEWMILNS
|Newmilns, Greenholm
|East Ayrshire
|-
!KA17
|DARVEL
|Darvel
|East Ayrshire
|-
!KA18
|CUMNOCK
|Cumnock, Auchinleck, Ochiltree, New Cumnock, Muirkirk, Smallburn, Lugar, Logan
|East Ayrshire
|-
!KA19
|MAYBOLE
|Maybole, Crosshill, Straiton, Kirkoswald
|South Ayrshire
|-
!KA20
|STEVENSTON
|Stevenston
|North Ayrshire
|-
!KA21
|SALTCOATS
|Saltcoats
|North Ayrshire
|-
!KA22
|ARDROSSAN
|Ardrossan, Whitlees, Chapelhill
|North Ayrshire
|-
!KA23
|WEST KILBRIDE
|West Kilbride
|North Ayrshire
|-
!KA24
|DALRY
|Dalry, Drakemyre
|North Ayrshire
|-
!KA25
|KILBIRNIE
|Kilbirnie
|North Ayrshire
|- 
!KA26
|GIRVAN
|Girvan, Turnberry, Dailly, Old Dailly, Ballantrae, Colmonell, Barrhill
|South Ayrshire
|-
!KA27
|ISLE OF ARRAN
|Brodick, Lochranza, Machrie, Kilmory, Kildonan, Holy Island
|North Ayrshire
|-
!KA28
|ISLE OF CUMBRAE
|Millport
|North Ayrshire
|-
!KA29
|LARGS
|Largs, Glenside, Fairlie, Kelburn
|North Ayrshire
|-
!KA30
|LARGS
|Largs
|North Ayrshire
|}

Map

See also
Postcode Address File
List of postcode areas in the United Kingdom

References

External links
Royal Mail's Postcode Address File
A quick introduction to Royal Mail's Postcode Address File (PAF)

East Ayrshire
North Ayrshire
South Ayrshire
Postcode areas covering Scotland